Finland competed at the 1912 Summer Olympics in Stockholm, Sweden.
The Grand Duchy of Finland was part of the Russian Empire at the time, but Finland's results are kept separate from those of Russia. In the Opening Ceremony Finland's team paraded under the national insignia flag of a Swedish-speaking female gymnastics club in Helsinki. 164 competitors, 162 men and 2 women, took part in 49 events in 10 sports.

Medalists

Aquatics

Diving

Six divers, all men, represented Finland. It was Finland's second appearance in diving, with both of the divers who had represented the nation in 1908 returning. Toivo Aro was the only Finnish diver to advance to the finals, doing so in both of his events. His fifth-place finish in the plain high diving was Finland's best performance to date, improving upon his own sixth-place finish in the 1908 platform competition.

Rankings given are within the diver's heat.

 Men

Swimming

Six swimmers, including two women, competed for Finland at the 1912 Games. It was the second time the nation had competed in swimming, in which Finland had competed each time the nation appeared independently. Aaltonen had the best finish of the Games, finishing third in his 400-metre breaststroke final to barely miss qualification for the final.

Ranks given for each swimmer are within the heat.

 Men

 Women

Athletics

23 athletes represented Finland. It was the second appearance of the nation in athletics, as well as at the Olympics. The Finland athletics team finished with 6 gold medals, 4 silvers, and 3 bronzes—a great improvement over the single bronze Finland won in 1908.

Hannes Kolehmainen finished with the Olympic records in the 5000 and 10000 metres, as well as gold medals in both events and the individual cross country. Armas Taipale added another gold medal and Olympic record in the discus throw, bettering the new Olympic record that Elmer Niklander set and briefly held in the preliminary round; Taipale won a second gold in the two handed version of the discus. Julius Saaristo set an Olympic record in the javelin, though it was quickly surpassed; he finished with the silver medal. The Finns swept the medals in the two handed javelin throw, with Saaristo atop the standings.

Ranks given are within that athlete's heat for running events.

Cycling

Five cyclists represented Finland. It was the first appearance of the nation in cycling. Antti Raita had the best time in the time trial, the only race held, placing 6th. The four Finnish cyclists who finished had a combined time that placed them 5th of the 15 teams.

Road cycling

Football

First round

Quarterfinals

Semifinals

Bronze medal match

Final rank 4th place

Gymnastics

Twenty-four gymnasts represented Finland. It was the second appearance of the nation in gymnastics, in which Finland had competed at its only prior Olympic appearance. The Finnish team placed second in the team free system event; this silver medal was Finland's best gymnastics result to date, improving upon the bronze medal the team had won in 1908.

Artistic

Rowing 

Six rowers represented Finland. It was the nation's first appearance in rowing.

(Ranks given are within each crew's heat.)

Sailing 

Twenty seven sailors represented Finland. It was the nation's first appearance in sailing. The Finns took three medals, but were unable to a win any gold medals.

(7 points for 1st in each race, 3 points for 2nd, 1 point for 3rd. Race-off to break ties in total points if necessary for medal standings.)

Shooting 

Nineteen shooters represented Finland. It was the nation's second appearance in shooting, in which Finland had competed each time the nation appeared at the Olympics independently. The Finns won two bronze medals in the running deer competitions—an individual medal for Toivonen and a team medal.

Wrestling

Greco-Roman

Finland, competing independently in the Olympics for the second time, sent 37 wrestlers for its second Olympic wrestling appearance. The country was the most successful in the sport, taking seven of 15 medals. The Finns took the top spot in four of the five weight classes (three gold medals and a silver in the class in which no gold was awarded). They compiled a record of 118-64 (112-58 excluding matches pitting two Finnish wrestlers against each other) in the elimination rounds and 8-5-1 (6-3-1 against non-Finns) in the medal rounds.

Koskelo and Väre were the best performers, cruising through their respective weight classes without losses to take gold medals.

Saarela and Olin suffered losses only to other Finns in the heavyweight. Olin was beaten by Viljaama in the elimination rounds, but gave Saarela the latter's only loss of the tournament one round later. The two met again in the final, with Saarela winning the rematch to take the gold medal while Olin received silver.

Böhling made it through the elimination rounds undefeated, and won his match against Varga in the medals round to advance to the final against Ahlgren. The two wrestlers competed for nine hours without either being able to take a win; the match was declared drawn and both wrestlers received silver medals. No gold medal was given in the weight class.

Asikainen's only elimination round loss came in a double-disqualification against eventual gold medalist Johansson. In the medal round, he faced Klein in a bout that lasted 11 hours and 40 minutes. Neither wrestler was able to continue after this grueling match, so Asikainen's loss in it led to him taking the bronze medal, and Klein the silver, while the Swede Johansson walked over against first Asikainen and then Klein to take the gold.

References

External links

Official Olympic Reports
International Olympic Committee results database

Nations at the 1912 Summer Olympics
1912
Olympics